Fodina viettei is a moth in the family Erebidae. It is found in north-western Madagascar.

The female of this species has a wingspan of 31 mm. The holotype was found in Ankarafantsika

References

Moths described in 1959
Calpinae
Moths of Madagascar
Moths of Africa